Dyal is a surname. Notable people with the surname include:

 Kenneth W. Dyal (1910–1978), American politician
 Mike Dyal (born 1966), American football player
 Ranjit Singh Dyal (1928–2012), Indian Army general and administrator

English-language surnames